Playing is a 2007 Brazilian documentary film by Eduardo Coutinho, about the friction between truth and fiction in the cinema.

In the 2010s it was ranked as number 17 on the Abraccine Top 100 Brazilian films list and also number 2 in the documentary list.

Plot
In response to a newspaper ad, 83 women responded and told their life story in a studio. Twenty-three of them were selected and filmed in June 2006. In September of the same year, several actresses interpreted, in their own way, the same stories.

Cast
Andréa Beltrão as herself
Fernanda Torres as herself
Marilia Pera as herself
Aleta Gomes Vieira as herself
Claudiléa Cerqueira de Lemos as herself
Débora Almeida as herself
Gisele Alves Moura as herself
Jeckie Brown as herself
Lana Guelero as herself
Maria de Fátima Barbosa as herself
Marina D'Elia as herself
Mary Sheila as herself
Sarita Houli Brumer as herself

Promotion
Playing was included in the Official Selection at the International Film Festival in Punta del Este, and received its first international public screening there in February, 2008.

On April, 2008 the film was also screened at the Buenos Aires International Festival of Independent Cinema and at the Tribeca Film Festival.

The film made subsequent appearances at the Locarno Film Festival (on August 7, 2008) and the Los Angeles Film Festival (on November 19, 2014).

In Brazil, the film had its premiere at the São Paulo International Film Festival in October, 2007 and had its theatrical release on November 9, 2007.

Accolades

References

External links
 

2007 documentary films
2007 films
Brazilian documentary films
2000s Portuguese-language films